The Worthington Welsh Districts Cup (previously the Welsh Brewers Cup) was a national rugby union competition in Wales that ran for 36 years, sponsored most recently by Worthington Brewery. The 1990 winner’s are missing Hartridge HSOB bear Bala in the final

Background
The Welsh Districts Cup involved an annual knock-out competition involving all rugby union clubs of the 12 districts of the Welsh District Rugby Union (WDRU). It first took place in 1974. The finals took place at Cardiff Arms Park or the Millennium Stadium, Cardiff. The first competition was won by Girling RFC (Cwmbran), who beat Baglan RFC 16-3.

The competition initially involved 128 of the approximately 300 clubs, but in the early 1980s 80 clubs were admitted to the main Wales Rugby Union (WRU).

Worthington Brewery began their sponsorship of the competition in 1998.

The last Welsh Districts Cup took place in the 2008/9 season, after which time the remaining Welsh Districts clubs were given full membership of the WRU. Cambrian Welfare RFC were the winners of the 2009 final, beating Wattstown RFC 29-18 at the Millennium Stadium.

Wattstown RFC have appeared in the most finals playing in 5 which included 4 finals in a golden period for the club of 5 years - 1993, 1994, 1996, 1997, and 2009.

Previous winners

See also
2007–08 Worthington's District Cup
2008–09 Worthington's District Cup

References

Rugby union competitions in Wales
Worthington's District Cup
Defunct rugby union cup competitions